This is a list of seasons played by Partick Thistle from 1877 to the present day. It details the club's achievements in major competitions, and the top league goal scorers for each season.

Seasons

References

Soccerbase
Partick Thistle Official Website

Seasons
 
Partick Thistle
Seasons